This is a list of the heaviest people who have been weighed and verified, living and dead.

Heaviest people ever recorded

See also 
Edward Bright (1721–1750) and Daniel Lambert (1770–1809), men from England who were famous in their time for their obesity.
Paul Kimelman (born 1947), holder of Guinness World Record for the greatest weight-loss in the shortest amount of time, 1982
Billy and Benny McCrary, holders of Guinness World Records's World's Heaviest Twins.
Alayna Morgan (1948–2009), heavy woman from Santa Rosa, California.
Ricky Naputi (1973–2012), heaviest man from Guam.
Renee Williams (1977–2007), woman from Austin, Texas.
 Barry Austin and Jack Taylor, two obese British men documented in the comedy-drama The Fattest Man in Britain.

References 

Heaviest people
Biological records
Lists of people-related superlatives
Obesity
People